SRF may refer to:

Organisations:
 Sudan Revolutionary Front, alliance of armed groups formed in 2011
 Syria Revolutionaries Front, formed in December 2013
 Schweizer Radio und Fernsehen, German-language broadcaster in Switzerland
 SRF Limited, an Indian manufacturing company
 SENS Research Foundation, on the medicine of ageing, Mountain View, California, USA
 Supercentenarian Research Foundation, on why supercentenarians live longer than most and why they die

Science and technology:
 Self resonant frequency, of an electronic component
 Serum response factor, in genetics
 Server Response File, ATL Server
 Solid recovered fuel, from waste
 Superconducting radio frequency technology, superconductors in RF devices
 .srf, computer file extension for a raw image file

Other:
 Self-Realization Fellowship, spiritual organization
 Silk Road Fund, Chinese state backed investment fund
 SleepResearch Facility, a musician
 Spec Racer Ford, a class of racing car
 State revolving fund
 Scholar Rescue Fund
 Strategic Rocket Forces of the Russian Federation
 Systematic reconnaissance flight